California National University for Advanced Studies was an online university headquartered in Torrance, California. The college is accredited by the Distance Education and Training Council. California National University closed January 19, 2018

References

External links 
  - official website

Online universities and colleges
Distance education institutions based in the United States
Distance Education Accreditation Commission
Universities and colleges in Los Angeles County, California
Educational institutions established in 1993
1993 establishments in California
Private universities and colleges in California